Hermione is an opera in 4 acts, Op. 40, by Max Bruch to a libretto by Emil Hopffer, based on Shakespeare's The Winter's Tale. The opera premiered March 21, 1872, in Berlin.

Recordings
Aria of Leontes (No. 7): "Setzt Ihnen nach!", Aria of Leontes (No. 19): "Allein, allein mit meinem Gram" by  bass, Capriccio 1996

References

External links
Libretto, N. Simrock, Library of Congress (in German)

1872 operas
Compositions by Max Bruch
Operas based on works by William Shakespeare
Operas